The 1974 South American Championships was a men's tennis tournament for male players that was part of the 1974 Commercial Union Assurance Grand Prix. It was played in Buenos Aires, Argentina, and held from 18 November through 24 November 1974. First-seeded Guillermo Vilas won the singles title.

Finals

Singles

 Guillermo Vilas defeated  Manuel Orantes 6–3, 0–6, 7–5, 6–2
 It was Vilas's 6th singles title of the year and the 7th of his career.

Doubles
 Manuel Orantes /  Guillermo Vilas defeated  Patricio Cornejo /  Jaime Fillol 6–4, 6–3 
 It was Orantes's 5th title of the year and the 25th of his career. It was Vilas's 10th title of the year and the 11th of his career.

References

External links 
 ITF tournament edition details
 ATP tournament profile

1974
1974 Grand Prix (tennis)
1974 in Argentine tennis
November 1974 sports events in South America